The Justiciar of Galloway was an important legal office in the High Medieval Kingdom of Scotland.

The Justiciars of Galloway were responsible for the administration of royal justice in the province of Galloway. The other Justiciar positions were the Justiciar of Lothian and the Justiciar of Scotia. The institution may date to the reign of King William of Scotland (died 1214).

List of Justiciars of Galloway, (incomplete)
Lochlann of Galloway (d.1200)
John I Comyn, Lord of Badenoch (1258)
Stephen Fleming (1263-1264)
Aymer Maxwell (1264)
William St. Clair (1288)
Roger Skoter (1296) 
John de Botetourt (1303) 
Roger de Kirkpatrick  and Walter de Burghdon  (1305)
John Gordon of Lochinvar (-1586)

Notes

References
Taylor, Alice. The Shape of the State in Medieval Scotland, 1124-1290 - Oxford Studies In Medieval European History, Oxford University Press, 2016. 

Medieval Scots law
Scots law formal titles
College of Justice
12th-century establishments in Scotland
Lists of office-holders in Scotland